Erigeron canadensis (synonym Conyza canadensis) is an annual plant native throughout most of North America and Central America. It is also widely naturalized in Eurasia and Australia. Common names include horseweed, Canadian horseweed, Canadian fleabane, coltstail, marestail, and butterweed. It was the first weed to have developed glyphosate resistance, reported in 2001 from Delaware.

Description
Erigeron canadensis is an annual plant growing to 1.5 m (60 in) tall, with sparsely hairy stems. They grow in an alternate spiral up the stem and the lower ones wither early. The flowers are produced in dense inflorescences 1 cm in diameter. Each individual flower has a ring of white or pale purple ray florets and a centre of yellow disc florets. The fruit is a cypsela tipped with dirty white down.

E. canadensis is distinguished by bracts that have a brownish inner surface and no red dot at the tip, and are free (or nearly free) of the hairs found on the bracts of the other species.

Distribution and habitat
Horseweed originated in North America and is very widespread there, but has spread to inhabited areas of most of the temperate zone of Asia, Europe, and Australia. It is found in Britain from northern Scotland to Cornwall, growing as a weed of arable land and man-made environments. It is considered invasive in China.

Weed status
Horseweed is commonly considered a weed, and in Ohio, it has been declared a noxious weed. It can be found in fields, meadows, and gardens throughout its native range.  Horseweed infestations have reduced soybean yields by as much as 83%.  It is an especially problematic weed in no-till agriculture, as it is often resistant to glyphosate and other herbicides. Farmers are advised to include 2,4-D or dicamba in a burndown application prior to planting to control horseweed.

Uses
The Zuni people insert the crushed flowers of E. canadensis var. canadensis into the nostrils to cause sneezing, relieving rhinitis. Other Native Americans used a preparation of the plant's leaves to treat sore throat and dysentery. A tincture can be made from the dried flowering tops of the plants.

Horseweed is a preferable material for use in the hand drill-method of making friction fire.

References

External links

canadensis
Flora of North America
Plants used in traditional Native American medicine
Plants described in 1753
Ruderal species
Taxa named by Carl Linnaeus